Baneswar is a census town in the Cooch Behar II CD block in the Cooch Behar Sadar subdivision of the Cooch Behar district in West Bengal, India.

Etymology
The word 'Baneswar' came from Ban+eeswar. Ban was a 'king of Asura'. He carried out 'Shiva linga', and wished to bring eeswar (Lord Shiva) to 'Patal', but he failed. The 'Shiva linga' fixed at where the temple could see today. Not only local people but also many outsiders come to pray. Debotro trust  organises Shiva mela every year (during shiv chaturdashi, i.e. the 14th lunar day of the dark fortnight of the month of Magha) near the temple.

Geography

Location

Area overview
The map alongside shows the north-central part of the district. It has the highest level of urbanisation in an overwhelming rural district. 22.08% of the population of the Cooch Behar Sadar subdivision lives in the urban areas and 77.92% lives in the rural areas. The entire district forms the flat alluvial flood plains of mighty rivers.
 
Note: The map alongside presents some of the notable locations in the subdivision. All places marked in the map are linked in the larger full screen map.

Demographics
As per the 2011 Census of India, Baneswar had a total population of 4,841.  There were 2,534 (52%) males and 2,307 (48%) females. There were 448 persons in the age range of 0 to 6 years. The total number of literate people in Baneswar was 4,108 (93.51% of the population over 6 years).

Infrastructure
According to the District Census Handbook 2011, Koch Bihar, Baneswar covered an area of 2.3838 km2. Among the civic amenities, it had 1 km roads with open drains, the protected water supply involved  tan/pond/lake. It had 600  electric connections. Among the medical facilities it had 1 dispensary/ health centre, 1 veterinary hospital, 15 medicine shop. Among the educational facilities it had 2  primary schools, 4 middle schools, 1 secondary school, 1 senior secondary school. It had 1 recognised short-hand, typewriting and vocational training institution. Among the social, cultural and recreational facilities it had 1 public library and 1 reading room. It had the branch offices of 1 nationalised bank, 1 agricultural credit society.

Transport
Baneswar is well connected with the district town Cooch Behar (12 km) and district Alipurduar (13 km).

Education
Baneswar Sarathibala Mahavidyalaya was established in 2009. Affiliated with the  Cooch Behar Panchanan Barma University, it offers honours courses in Bengali, English, Sanskrit, history and education, and a general course in arts.

There is a boys' school, Baneswar Khabsa High School, and a girls' school, Baneswar Girls High School. Both are run by the state government. Sarathibala college is located in this village.

Culture

The place is known for the Baneswar Shiva temple, and for its tortoises (locally known as 'Mohan') which live in 'Shiva pukur' near the temple.

References

External links

Cities and towns in Cooch Behar district